Bembecia sirphiformis is a moth of the family Sesiidae. It is found in France, Spain, Portugal and Italy. It is also found in North Africa.

The wingspan is 26–27 mm.

The larvae feed on Astragalus monspessulanus, Astragalus granatensis, Colutea arborescens and Acanthyllis armata.

References

Moths described in 1849
Sesiidae
Moths of Europe
Moths of Africa